Buffalo Dreams is a 2005 American Western television film directed by David Jackson on Disney Channel Original Movie.

Plot
Set against the backdrop of New Mexico, the film follows a boy, Josh Townsend, who moves because of his father's job and becomes involved with a group of teens attempting to preserve the buffalo and Navajo traditions. Along the way he makes friends and learns important lessons about life. The movie teaches about a few Navajo traditions. Josh eventually enters a race against his rival and proves to be the better of the two; however, he quits the race after seeing the buffalo herd stampeding. Josh quickly gathers his friends to save the town, and while his rival refuses to help, his friends do. Together, they herd the buffalo away from the town and back onto their preserve. During the process, Josh's friend Thomas Blackhorse falls in front of a buffalo, but is saved by his sister who finally speaks for the first time in years to help calm the buffalo. Josh and his friends are hailed as heroes by the town and in recognition of his bravery, Josh is made an honorary member of the Navajo tribe with the name Rides With the Wind. He and Thomas, who he had trouble getting along with before, make a pact to keep the buffalo safe together.

Production
The film was shot in 2004 on location in Utah.

Cast
 Reiley McClendon as Josh Townsend
 Simon R. Baker as Thomas Blackhorse
 Graham Greene as John Blackhorse
 Tessa Vonn as Scout Blackhorse
 Max Van Ville as Moon
 Chris Hunter as Kyle
 Adrienne Bailon as Domino
 Geraldine Keams as Abuela Rose
 Christopher Robin Miller as Virgil
 George Newbern as Dr. Nick Townsend
 Seth Packard as Wylie
 Jane Sibbett as Blaine Townsend
 Justin Stern as Luke
 Chris White as J.G.

Awards 
In 2006 the film was nominated for the Directors Guild of America Award for Outstanding Directing – Children's Programs for David S. Jackson and for Best Performance in a TV Movie, Miniseries or Special - Supporting Young Actress for Tessa Vonn at the 27th Young Artist Awards.

References

External links 
 

2005 television films
2000s English-language films
2000s teen drama films
American teen drama films
Disney Channel Original Movie films
Films about Native Americans
Films scored by Ramin Djawadi
Films set in New Mexico
Films shot in Utah
American Western (genre) television films
Films directed by David Jackson (director)
2005 films
American drama television films
2000s American films